bertemu is the 8th studio album by Megumi Hayashibara. Many of the songs on the album are from the Anime series Neon Genesis Evangelion and Slayers. The lyrics for several of the songs were written by Hayashibara under the pen name MEGUMI. The album was released in two editions, a regular edition and a limited edition with cardboard sleeve and hardcover photobook. The album reached Number 3 on the Oricon music charts. It has also been reissued on at least one occasion.

Track list

 Give a reason
 Touch Yourself
  
 
 Midnight Blue
 
 
 -Life- 
 Fly Me To The Moon (Ayanami version)
 Shining Girl
 Nostalgic Lover
 Too Late (new version)
 Going History
 Cherish Christmas

References

1996 albums
Megumi Hayashibara albums